The 1963 All-Ireland Senior Football Championship Final was the 76th All-Ireland Final and the deciding match of the 1963 All-Ireland Senior Football Championship, an inter-county Gaelic football tournament for the top teams in Ireland. 

Brian McDonald took the line ball that led to Dublin's goal, which was finished by Simon Behan after a small-rectangle scuffle involving six defenders and four attackers. Galway narrowed the gap to one point near the end, but John Timmons put Dublin two ahead. Referee Eamon Moules (Wicklow) denied Galway a last-minute penalty.

Galway were beaten by a Simon Behan goal.

Man of the match was Leo Hickey.

Dublin: Pascal Flynn; Leo Hickey, Lar Foley, Bill Casey; Des McKane, Paddy Holden, Mick Kissane; Des Foley, John Timmons; Brian McDonald, Mickey Whelan, Gerry Davey; Simon Behan, Des Ferguson, Nicky Fox.

Galway: Michael Moore; Seán Meade, Noel Tierney, Bosco McDermott; John Donnellan, Enda Colleran, Martin Newell; Mick Garrett, Mick Reynolds; Cyril Dunne, Mattie McDonagh, Pat Donnellan; John Keenan, Seán Cleary, Séamus Leydon. Sub: Brian Geraghty for Seán Cleary.

References

All-Ireland Senior Football Championship Final
All-Ireland Senior Football Championship Final, 1963
All-Ireland Senior Football Championship Finals
All-Ireland Senior Football Championship Finals
Dublin county football team matches
Galway county football team matches